Hayawa is the name of a suburb of Khor Fakkan, in Sharjah, United Arab Emirates (UAE).

Populated places in the Emirate of Sharjah